Airport Drive is a village in Jasper County, Missouri, United States. The population was 766 at the 2020 census. It is part of the Joplin, Missouri Metropolitan Statistical Area. The community is still commonly referred to as "Stone's Corner," as the intersection of Route 43 and Route 171 is known.

Geography
Airport Drive is located at  (37.141770, -94.514392).

Climate

Demographics

2010 census
As of the census of 2010, there were 698 people, 300 households, and 203 families living in the village. The racial makeup of the village was 95.7% White, 1.7% Native American, 0.6% Asian, 0.1% from other races, and 1.9% from two or more races. Hispanic or Latino of any race were 3.4% of the population.

There were 300 households, of which 27.0% had children under the age of 18 living with them, 55.7% were married couples living together, 9.0% had a female householder with no husband present, 3.0% had a male householder with no wife present, and 32.3% were non-families. 26.7% of all households were made up of individuals, and 11.4% had someone living alone who was 65 years of age or older. The average household size was 2.33 and the average family size was 2.77.

The median age in the village was 43.6 years. 20.2% of residents were under the age of 18; 8.5% were between the ages of 18 and 24; 23.2% were from 25 to 44; 28.7% were from 45 to 64; and 19.3% were 65 years of age or older. The gender makeup of the village was 48.6% male and 51.4% female.

2000 census
As of the census of 2000, there were 622 people, 248 households, and 176 families living in the village. The population density was 312.9 people per square mile (120.7/km). There were 270 housing units at an average density of 135.8 per square mile (52.4/km). The racial makeup of the village was 93.41% White, 0.32% African American, 2.25% Native American, 0.48% Asian, 0.48% from other races, and 3.05% from two or more races. Hispanic or Latino of any race were 0.80% of the population.

There were 248 households, out of which 25.4% had children under the age of 18 living with them, 59.7% were married couples living together, 8.5% had a female householder with no husband present, and 29.0% were non-families. 23.0% of all households were made up of individuals, and 10.5% had someone living alone who was 65 years of age or older. The average household size was 2.40 and the average family size was 2.82.

In the village, the population was spread out, with 18.3% under the age of 18, 10.5% from 18 to 24, 21.4% from 25 to 44, 29.1% from 45 to 64, and 20.7% who were 65 years of age or older. The median age was 45 years. For every 100 females, there were 100.6 males. For every 100 females age 18 and over, there were 104.0 males.

The median income for a household in the village was $38,750, and the median income for a family was $42,083. Males had a median income of $34,167 versus $23,750 for females. The per capita income for the village was $19,678. About 3.9% of families and 6.8% of the population were below the poverty line, including 12.1% of those under age 18 and none of those age 65 or over.

References

 https://www.census.gov/

Villages in Jasper County, Missouri
Joplin, Missouri, metropolitan area
Villages in Missouri